Cylindrolobus aporoides is a species of plant within the orchid family. It is native to New Guinea, the Philippines, and Sulawesi.

References

aporoides
Flora of New Guinea
Flora of Sulawesi
Flora of the Philippines